Kormac is a DJ, producer, and composer from Dublin. In the mid-2000s, Kormac was a turntablist and multi-instrumentalist in the Irish experimental band 8Ball. In 2007, Kormac released his first solo EP, Scratch Marchin'. Kormac has performed with a full ensemble of brass, strings, drums, electronics, bass, and guitar as Kormac’s Big Band. In 2014, Kormac's song "Wake Up" from the album Doorsteps was nominated for the Choice Music Prize of Irish Song of the Year.

Kormac has played festivals including Glastonbury, Bestival, Electric Picnic, Sonar and toured the UK, Europe, Eastern Europe, Australia and Canada alongside luminaries Portishead, Nas, Flaming Lips, Sonic Youth, Snarky Puppy and a host of others. Current streaming figures are estimated to be in excess of 30 million.

After nearly a decade-long hiatus, Kormac released Equivalent Exchange, featuring the Irish Chamber Orchestra, on 11 November 2022.

Early life
After learning guitar at the age of twelve,  O'Halloran began sampling French and German tapes from his school, making demos on a 4-track recorder. He graduated from Trinity College, Dublin's Music and Media Technology Masters programme in 2004.

Career 

As a turntablist and multi-instrumentalist for alternative rock band 8Ball, Kormac performed on two full-length albums, 8Ball in 2005 and With All Your Friends in 2009.

Kormac released his first solo record, The Scratch Marchin' EP in 2007 via Scribble Records. The record fused heavily processed, obscure jazz samples with his own recordings. He subsequently made several DJ appearances.

He followed with the Good Lord EP in 2008, this time using early Gospel music recordings for source material and inspiration.

With a background in playing in bands and performing live, Kormac began to recreate his music live on stage with a group of musicians (bass, drums, brass, vocalists, guitars, electronics) and VJs. Kormac's Big Band performed their first full show at the Electric Picnic Festival in 2008. Kormac's Big Band performed at the Galway Arts Festival in 2013.

Kormac released his first LP record Word Play in 2010. The record featured collaborations with DJ Yoda, DJ Cheeba, MC Little Tree, Messiah J & The Expert and Koaste. The album featured the track "Wash My Hands", which was used in several international ad campaigns and was licensed to several compilations.

He later toured in the UK, Western and Eastern Europe, Australia, Canada and Africa.

Kormac released Doorsteps in 2014 on Bodytonic Records. A largely collaborative affair, it took nearly two years to complete. Kormac visited the homes of Scottish author Irvine Welsh (Trainspotting, Filth, Acid House), Texan singer/songwriter Micah P. Hinson, Mercury Music Prize winner, Speech Debelle, Koaste, MC Little Tree and Bajka.

The lead single "Wake Up" was nominated for a Meteor Choice Music prize award.  Kormac's Big Band played sold-out shows in Ireland, the UK, Australia and Europe to support the release.

He was commissioned by Jameson to make tracks using only sounds he recorded at their factory in County Cork.

In 2021, Kormac set the poem "Bushmills" by Dublin-born spoken word artist Stephen James Smith to music for a video commissioned by Old Bushmills Distillery's Causeway Collection.

Discography

References

External links
 
 

Living people
House musicians
Irish electronic musicians
Irish DJs
DJs from Dublin (city)
Irish jazz musicians
Irish producers
Musicians from Dublin (city)
Year of birth missing (living people)